This article details fictional characters in the animated television series Loonatics Unleashed. Below are the heroes, villains and minor characters of the series.

Loonatics
The main characters of the series. These characters are the descendants of the classic Looney Tunes characters, according to multiple press releases and official sources. Descendants of other Looney Tunes are unverified.

Ace Bunny
Ace Bunny (voiced by Charlie Schlatter) is a clever, savvy,  born leader, who wears his uniform with yellow accents, and is Bugs Bunny's descendant. Ace is the team's leader. He fights in close proximity of his enemies, using his martial arts skills more than his laser vision. An adept martial artist and swords-hare; his sword, as revealed in the second season is a weapon from the planet Freleng (link to Friz Freleng) called the Guardian Strike Sword. Before getting his powers, Ace was a martial arts stunt double in films.

Most fans believe Ace could be in love with one of his teammates Lexi Bunny because in episode twenty-one "It Came From Outer Space" he quickly took action on rescuing Lexi from Melvin The Martian. Ace loves to toy with his opponents like his ancestor did. However, in cases of someone who has the ability to a level where they could be a potential threat to him and his team dealing with them, he does so less, e.g. Massive, Sypher, Optimatus and Deuce. Like his ancestor, Ace possesses a Brooklyn accent and uses the catchphrases "What's up, [noun]?" ("doc" at least twice), or "you realize, of course, this means war". Like his ancestor (and generally all rabbits in the franchise), Ace loves to eat carrots, although he also has been shown eating carrot ice cream (as well as non-carrot flavoured ice-cream) and drinking carrot smoothies. As rabbits have very strong eyesight, his powers come from his eyes. In "Apocalypso", he shows his ancestor's cross-dressing tendencies by dressing like a woman. Also, in "It Came From Outer Space", he confuses Melvin to take an explosive in the same way his ancestor did to Marvin (Melvin's own ancestor).

Abilities and weapons:
 Optical Enhancement: IR vision laser lock.
 Laser Vision: Can shoot destructive laser blasts from his eyes.
 Guardian Strike Sword: Primary weapon used for weapon-to-weapon combat, later is able to generate powerful charges of energy.

Lexi Bunny
Lexi Bunny (voiced by Jessica DiCicco) is the trendy female rabbit, second-in-command with pink on her uniform, and is Lola Bunny's descendant. Lexi is the team's eavesdropper. She is the only female team member as well as considered to be Ace's second-in-command. Before gaining her powers, Lexi was a student at Acmetropolis University who tried to join the school's cheerleading squad. The captain, afraid she would be overshadowed in terms of skill, did not accept her. Nevertheless, Lexi is the most agile and acrobatic member of the team. Her relation to Ace, if any, is unclear. She could also be in love with Ace and does seem to care deeply about him.

Lexi occasionally expresses concern about her looks, the first time being in the pilot episode "Loonatics on Ice" when Zadavia tells them about the freeze; Lexi mutters about how wearing a sweater would make her look chubby. A further example is in "The World Is My Circus" after being mutated by the DNA scrambler of RingMaster and Otto she says that they cannot keep fighting and the Pepe Le Pew look is not her. This is an ironic statement as she, along with all the other Loonatics, would eventually encounter Pierre Le Pew (the evil human parody of Pepe Le Pew) who observed her placing a pterosaur back into the Acmetropolis Zoo (it was implied that he released the animals to be able to recruit Slam to his illegal fights arena) and Pierre attempted to flirt with/hit on her by complimenting her looks. Lexi, however, was predictably repulsed by Pierre's stench and creepy mannerisms. Lexi also has sea sickness.

Abilities:
 Sonic Hearing: Possesses expert eavesdropping skills and hyper-sensitive hearing.
 Brain Blast: The ability to shoot concentrated destructive psychic energy from the top of her head. She often launches them in spherical blasts, as opposed to a consistent stream. These blasts also manifest as waves under water. 
 Chlorokinesis: The ability to mentally control the growth of plants by emitting a brain blast at a chosen plant, and the ability to swiftly create plants (since this was not one of her original powers and she has not used it since, it may be assumed that this was only temporary).

Danger Duck
Danger Duck (voiced by Jason Marsden), or just Duck, is the spotlight hungry, egotistical member of the Loonatics, wears an orange uniform, and is Daffy Duck's descendant. Duck is a strategic wildcard; he has quite possibly the most destructive potential in the entire team, since his "Eggs" could produce theoretically any substance in existence. Duck longs to one day lead the Loonatics, though he does seem to tolerate Ace's leadership. Before gaining his powers, Duck worked as a swimming pool cleaner, and true to form, he dreamed of becoming a lifeguard.

He is usually either shown up by other characters or annoying them with his antics. He is very boastful and has a habit of attempting to re-invent himself (such as requesting name changes for himself, or attempting to add a cape to his uniform). He can also be extremely opportunistic, once trying to be Slam Tasmanian's wrestling manager simply for profit, then haggling with Slam over how much each of them should get (with the preference that Duck receive 90% and Slam 10%). Of all the characters, he seems to be used most often as comic relief, despite (or perhaps due to) his arrogant personality. However, he proves his worth from time to time.

The episode "In the Pinkster" revealed that he is the second person to personally know a villain, as his childhood friend Pinkster turned out to be a villain, much to his horror. It was revealed in this episode that Duck grew up in an orphanage with his best friend Pinkster and was adopted by a human couple. Duck is the only member of the team who is not addressed by his first name, in fact he has only been called Danger Duck a few times by his teammates.

Abilities:
Power Orb Randomizer: Tosses powerful flaming spheres of energy (often referred to as "eggs"). The eggs usually expose or materialize other things upon explosion. This effect has ranged from creating orange juice, to tar, to large boulders, to simply explosive eggs. Duck has not learned to completely control the outcome of the materializations.
 Quantum Quack: The ability to teleport (or "quack" as Duck himself calls it) short distances through (and sometimes into) solid objects. There is a small delay after he teleports, to when he reappears, thus making it less efficient for long distance travel than Rev's Sonic Speed.
 Aqua Dense: When throwing his "eggs" near water, he instead fires powerful blast of aquatic energy. This is also the ability to mentally control water while using his aqua dense.

Slam Tasmanian
Slam Tasmanian (voiced by Kevin Michael Richardson) is the group's gluttonous, muscle-bound heavyweight, has purple on his uniform and is the Tasmanian Devil's descendant. Slam is the team's strongman, applying brute force when necessary. Slam's tornadoes allow him to create/counteract rotation in objects, create a tornado-like suction, as well as attack from a distance. Before gaining his powers, Slam earned his living as a professional wrestler, called the "Twisted Spinner" (The Terror from Somewhere).

Like his ancestor, Slam's speech sounds like simple grunting of English, but is implied to be dialogue the audience is not meant to understand, like his ancestor. The other Loonatics will sometimes mention what Slam said, effectively translating anything important. In the second season, he speaks better English, but still is not fluent in the language.

Abilities:
 Superhuman Strength: Considered to physically be the strongest in the team with brute force alone.
 Tornado Maximizer: The ability to spin into a tornado form. He can even fire tornado blasts from his hands.
 Thunder Mode: The ability to launch small (electric) tornadoes from his arms (according to the opening credits, he can use these powers at a "spin level" of "8447.8"), as well as spinning into a near-unstoppable electrical hurricane.

Tech E. Coyote
Tech E. Coyote (voiced by Kevin Michael Richardson) is the team's technician with green on his uniform, and is Wile E. Coyote's descendant. Tech is the team's technician and strategist. Due to his regenerative powers, Tech also acts as a shield for his teammates, taking damage that could potentially kill anyone else which instead turns him to dust (this is also a gag reference to how his ancestor, Wile E. Coyote was frequently injured and blown up in his attempts to catch the Road Runner). In the episode "Family Business" he even fell off a cliff twice like his ancestor does. His specialties include constructing equipment and conducting surveillance. Caring deeply for his creations (often referring to them as 'my babies'), he is often unhappy when they are destroyed or severely damaged. Before gaining his powers, Tech was a student at the Acme Institute, where his urge to achieve perfection led to numerous screw-ups.

Like his ancestor, Tech relies on scientific doodads with the distinctive difference that he makes them himself, and that they actually work the way he built them. Tech is rather obsessed with his creations, as seen when he exclaims in "The Menace of Mastermind" (after Mastermind tampers with his gizmos) "What has that ghastly woman done to my babies?!". Tech does not have an English accent, as his ancestor did, and he sometimes whimpers (In "Cape Duck"), growls (in "Family Business") and even howls (In "Cape Duck" also). He was the first Loonatic shown to have previously known a villain (Mallory "Mastermind" Casey from the Acme Institute).

Tech is good friends with Rev, despite the legendary rivalry between coyotes and roadrunners their descendants have shared.

Abilities:
 Superhuman Intelligence: Being the genius in the team, Tech's intellect is unrivaled and it often saves the team from potential danger.
 Magnetism Manipulation: The ability to create magnetic pulses that allow him to levitate metallic objects and scramble electronics. He can also create barriers with these pulses.
 Molecular Regeneration: Quick, self-recovery/healing factor (usually from disintegration) that renders him nearly indestructible from being blown up, though not invulnerable or immune to pain.

Rev Runner
Fast-talking Rev Runner (voiced by Rob Paulsen) is a head-spinningly quick character with red on his uniform, and the Road Runner's descendant. Rev is the team's speed and mobility unit. Rev's powers focus on traveling from place to place quickly, making him ideal for transporting people and objects in a short amount of time. His psychic GPS also allows him to locate people or objects. Unlike his ancestor, who only made a "meep-meep" noise, Rev can actually talk, though at high speed (in a manner similar to Blurr from the Transformers franchise, albeit a little slower), which sometimes confuses or annoys others. Before gaining his powers, Rev was a delivery boy for Quick Wrap Sandwich Shack and an inventor.

In numerous episodes, it is shown that without his powers, Rev, like his brother Rip, speaks at a normal speed; that is, more slowly than the average anthropomorphic roadrunner (although, curiously, he retains his rapid speech when swapping powers with Tech after an incident with a DNA scrambler in "The World is My Circus." Also, his parents, though seemingly unaffected by the meteor that struck Acmetropolis, talk as fast as him).

A lesser noted fact is that Rev is actually quite intelligent. He often serves as Tech's technical assistant, and frequently translates Tech's highly scientific vocabulary when the other Loonatics fail to understand him. Rev can usually solve (or at least understand) problems and situations that would otherwise be considered Tech's exclusive field of expertise, although it could be argued that his intelligence is largely due to his brain functioning at a much faster rate than others. In the second season, the bright/inventor aspect of his character was featured, to the point of creating some rivalry between him and Tech. However, the episode "Family Business" proved that Tech is the better inventor.

Rev is the only Loonatic that cannot physically harm the enemy via projected energy attacks, though he has often used his enhanced speed to augment his kicks as shown in the battle against Massive.

Rev's name may have been inspired by rapper Rev Run.

Abilities:
 Flight: Due to having superspeed, Rev can move or flap as fast as his feet enabling him to fly.
 Sonic Speed: Superhuman speed (according to the credits, he can run at a speed level of 9887.9)
 Global Positioning: Possesses a brain-embedded psychic GPS-tracking system, which enables Rev to detect people and objects far away (also known as a form of Clairvoyance)

Original allies

Zadavia
Zadavia (voiced by Candi Milo) is the Loonatics' supervisor and possible benefactor. She often appears to them as a hologram (she rarely appears in person). When appearing in her non-physical form, she usually contacts them to inform them of a threat to Acmetropolis and dispatches them to contain it. After the Loonatics have completed their mission, she follows up with congratulations, advice, commentary, and if necessary, reprove a member or members (usually Danger Duck). She has been shown to be very influential in Acmetropolis. She seems to possess natural energy-based superpowers/abilities, such as the ability to fire beams of rainbow colored energy from her eyes and hands and create a holographic version of herself with the same energy. Thus, these powers did not come from the supernatural forces released by the meteor, as early speculation dictated. In most of her appearances and situations, she seems very serious, if not outright stoic. Zadavia can display her emotions, though, as she did in the Acmegeddon two-part special.

It is currently assumed that she set the Loonatics up in their current residence (the 125th floor of a large tower, according to the episode "The World is My Circus") and pays for all their expenses, as no other explanation has yet been given. Fans also speculate that she might be the outright ruler of Acmetropolis, though her exact status, financial and political, are currently unverified. She made her first appearance in person at the end of "The World is My Circus", after being stuck in the form of a monkey-chameleon-cheetah mutant for most of the episode. In "The Music Villain," her powers were stolen by Rupes Oberon. She regained them after being prisoner to General Deuce. Throughout the second season of the show, it is discovered that she and her brother Optimatus are the rulers of Planet Freleng.

Dr. Fidel Chroniker
Dr. Fidel Chroniker (voiced by Jeff Bennett) is an aging inventor and grandfather to the Loonatics enemy Arthur "Time Skip" Chroniker. His work, attempting to develop a time machine, resulted in his grandson gaining a form of chronokinesis. He eventually made a working time machine which he could apparently use once a day to make contact with the past and turn back time, somewhat like the plots of the Back to the Future trilogy of films. Using this power, he repeatedly tried to warn the Loonatics about his grandson's evil plans, only to be denied help by Danger Duck, who thought the doctor was merely a foolish old man trying to find his grandson. When this did not work and the Loonatics, unprepared, nearly lost in battle against Time Skip and the Trolbot 9000, Fidel would turn back time and try again. He eventually came into contact with Ace Bunny, who had been the first to notice that time was repeating itself and the two devised a plan. When Duck agreed to help him, Fidel did scold him a bit for his earlier behavior. Finally, together with the Loonatics, he set a trap for his grandson. Then, after a few minor mishaps, Time Skip was eventually caught. At that moment, Fidel said something to the effect that it was for the boy's own good and inferred that he would make better traps to contain him until Time Skip is ready to change his ways. Tech is a fan of his work and has read all of Chroniker's notes on temporal displacement.

Other Looney Tunes-inspired characters
In some episodes there are heroes, villains and simple citizens that appear to be based on other Looney Tunes characters.

In the "Weathering Heights" episode, an old lady (who looks like Granny) looks at the Loonatics and says "I knew his (Ace's) great, great, great grandfather." She was referring to Bugs Bunny.

In "Family Business", the chef that works for Toby the Pizza Guy's boss Mr. Bronski resembled the "down and out" protagonist from One Froggy Evening.

Mr. Leghorn
Mr. Leghorn (voiced by Bill Farmer in the first appearance, Rob Paulsen in the second appearance) is a human who is based on Foghorn Leghorn. He is a big name in the world of professional sports including Basherball. Leghorn is the one who fires the starting ball to begin the game. He is the proud sponsor of the snack known as Chili Gurt, of which he gave a life-time supply to the Loonatics as thanks for stopping Massive, but Slam was the only one who took it. Leghorn simply poured it all into Slam's mouth.

Ophiuchus Sam
Ophiuchus Sam (voiced by Maurice LaMarche) is a descendant of Yosemite Sam. He shares the same voice and personality as his ancestor. Ophiuchus Sam attacked a space train carrying the treasures of Freleng. Sometimes, he cannot remember what he is saying and has even forgotten his own name. He secretly worked with Zadavia's former General, Deuce to steal Ace's Guardian Strike Sword. He ended up captured, but then released (under the pretense of a brilliant escape) in order to serve as bait for his boss.

Pierre Le Pew
Pierre Le Pew (voiced by Maurice LaMarche) is a human who is based on Pepé Le Pew. He fashions skunk-colored hair, a French accent, and stinky cologne which he claimed was called "eau du poisson". He is the proprietor of a floating arena called Max Arena, where illegal fights are held. During "I am Slamacus", Pierre convinced Slam Tasmanian to fight in his arena as a wrestler. He wields a walking stick with many functions, including: the power to teleport himself and others and full control over the Max Arena, especially its main ring. Pierre is disarmed of his cane and apprehended at the end of the episode.

NOTE: Pepé makes a cameo in the episode "The Hunter" frozen in Otto the Odd's "collection". He's seen trying to embrace Penelope Pussycat with her resisting. They are the only ones who are not unfrozen onscreen. It's never explained how Otto obtained them in the first place, but it's possible that he used a time machine to capture them.

Gorlop
Gorlop (vocal effects provided by Rob Paulsen) is a wrestler who is descended from Gossamer, and hails from a planet named after the character he is based on. He appears to be tiny, but he can grow when using his ability to consume energy but shrinks when expending it. Gorlop fought Slam on Pierre Le Pew's command. The Loonatics fed him enough energy to destroy the forcefield and defeat him. Afterwards, he seemed mad at Pierre and was reportedly returned to his home planet. He did not seem ill-intentioned, and Pierre was clearly using him.

Royal Tweetums
The Royal Tweetums (voiced by Joe Alaskey) is a royal descendant of Tweety. Like his ancestor, he takes great pleasure in tormenting Sylth Vester, and is responsible for multiple injuries inflicted upon the cat. He is highly fond of Danger Duck, and is not fully aware that the hero truly dislikes him at first. His home planet Blanc (a reference to Mel Blanc), was later invaded by Rubes Oberon, Optimatus, and Deuce, and he mysteriously disappears during the attack. His personality is nearly a carbon copy of the original Tweety. Twice in his first appearance, he says "I'm only thwee and a half parsecs old"; a reference to both Tweety's catchphrase of "I'm only thwee and a half years old" and the apparent use of parsecs as a measurement of time in Star Wars.

Sylth Vester
Sylth Vester (voiced by Joe Alaskey) is a descendant of Sylvester. Just like Queen Granicus and the Royal Tweetums, he is also a native of the planet Blanc (as seen in the episode Fall of Blanc). Sylth Vester wears a large suit of cyborg body armor, which covers various injuries inflicted on him by his previous encounters with Royal Tweetums. His name is a pun on Sith, Darth Vader (who was a Sith lord) and Sylvester. He has scars from his attempts to catch the Royal Tweetums. Among these are: A lack of back teeth, no hair from being dipped into molecular acid, an injured arm from being locked in a particle accelerator, & a disfigured face from being sucked into a black hole.

He works for Queen Grannicus in her plot to prevent the Royal Tweetums from reclaiming the throne. Both were defeated in the end.

When Optimatus invaded Blanc, the Loonatics freed Sylth Vester so he could help them find the Tweetums. He also helped them stopping Optimatus and Deuce's plan to rule the universe, although in the end, he was arrested by the Tweetums, for telling Deuce how to use the scepter.

Sylth Vester is a fierceful warrior, and is practically unstoppable in hand-to-hand combat, plus, he is not really a bad guy, since he helped the Loonatics in saving the universe, which can indicate that he is also able to do good.

Queen Grannicus
Queen Grannicus (voiced by Candi Milo in her normal voice, Kevin Michael Richardson in her disguised voice) is a villainous royal descendant of Granny, who actually protected Tweety from Sylvester. The ruler of the planet Blanc, she did not want the Royal Tweetums to claim the throne and allied with Sylth Vester to prevent that. To avoid suspicion, she used her scepter to disguise her voice while talking to Sylth Vester. Both were defeated.

Queen Grannicus is also similar to Darth Sidious due to her disguised voice and using a hooded robe when talking to Sylth Vester.

Harriet "Ma" Runner
Rev Runner's mother, Harriet Runner (voiced by Candi Milo) speaks quickly like her older son and her husband. Her eating style, natural superspeed, occasional utterances of "meep-meep" and personal issues with coyotes such as Tech E. are all deliberate references to the relationship between Wile E. Coyote and the Road Runner.

Ralph "Pa" Runner
Rev Runner's father, Ralph Runner (voiced by Daran Norris) owns a gadget business that he has always wanted Rev to join him in. Because of his devotion to Rev, he pointedly ignores his younger son Rip. Even when Rip thinks up a better way to market a gadget that Rev worked up, Ralph ignores the suggestion. However, after Rip is temporarily manipulated by a Bio-Tech Parasite, Ralph begins to see that he should give his younger son a chance. His eating style, natural superspeed, occasional utterances of "meep-meep" and personal issues with coyotes such as Tech E. are all deliberate references to the relationship between Wile E. Coyote and the Road Runner.

Rip Runner
Rev's younger brother and a leather-clad slacker, Rip Runner (voiced by Mikey Kelley) is somewhat the oddball of the family. He speaks at a normal/slow speed, acts fairly calm rather than hyperactive and never moves exceptionally fast, unlike his parents and his brother. However, after repeatedly seeing how much attention Rev got from his father for being a superhero and for his invention of the Robo Amigo toy, Rip became filled with jealousy. He became a victim of the Bio-Tech Parasite, which he used to turn the Robo Amigos into violent monstrosities alongside using a Molecular Reconstructer and started destroying Acmetropolis. Eventually, Rev was able to save his brother, and the two made up. To top it off, Rip's creation of a first edition Robo Amigo gained him some respect in the eyes of his father.

Sagittarius Stomper and his Mother
Sagittarius Stomper (voiced by Billy West) and his unnamed mother (voiced by Candi Milo) are descendants of the Shropshire Slasher and his mother. Stomper's mother is the head of a robotics company and built Stomper's arms and legs. She was seen when Duck unwittingly took down Stomper when Tech's new invention brought him down. Stomper vowed revenge and switched places with his mother (who was in a robot suit resembling Stomper). When Duck admitted Tech stopped Stomper, Stomper began to target both of them and found them hiding in the sewers. He was defeated and has now joined his mother in jail.

Electro J. Fudd
Electro J. Fudd (voiced by Billy West) is a hunter descendant of Elmer Fudd. He wears a large, high-tech suit and carries an assortment of hunting weapons. Electro was hired by Otto the Odd to capture Ace with terrible results and also getting Danger Duck accidentally in one of his traps. Later on, he changed his target to Danger Duck and used a net that negates his powers. Electro persuaded him that he's the "Greatest Action Hero in History" and went with Electro to Otto's lair. When Otto the Odd decided to freeze Electro and Duck together, both of them had to work together to escape Otto the Odd. Once Otto was defeated, Electro was arrested.

NOTE: Elmer makes a cameo in his death photo (he is being attacked by the biggest squirrel of all) which shows he really IS an ancestor of Elmer Fudd.

Melvin the Martian
A descendant of Marvin the Martian, Melvin the Martian (voiced by Joe Alaskey) is the general of the Martian army who comes to blow up Acmetropolis after his spacecraft was hit by a missile that came from Tech's X3000 Automated Weapons System when Rev and Lexi mistake it for a video game. He demanded the planet's surrender or he would destroy the planet. After a talk with Duck, Melvin decides to shrink it. When Lexi admitted tampering with Tech's invention, Melvin ordered the Loonatics to hand her over to him in 24 hours or "the planet will be hard to find on any map." Lexi ended up surrendering to Melvin and the Loonatics get her back using an idea from Rev-to create a Trojan horse. Meanwhile, Lexi faces off against Melvin in a game of Celestial Checkers (while Melvin is secretly having his warships shrink the rest of Acmetropolis); he also attempted to blow up Ace with a Uranium PU-36 Explosive Space Modulator (Marvin also used an Illudium PU-36 Explosive Space Modulator) but got his helmet blown off instead after arguing with him over who would get it. Ace, Duck, Rev and Slam rescue Lexi, restore Acmetropolis, and defeat Melvin who escapes with his dog Sergeant Sirius.

Sergeant Sirius
A robotic version of K-9, Sergeant Sirius is Melvin the Martian's dog and can fly. His name is a reference to Sirius.

Pinkster Pig
Pinkster Pig (voiced by Bob Bergen) is a villainous descendant of Porky Pig who grew up in the same orphanage as Danger Duck. When it came to adoption, Pinkster suggested a coin toss to determine who would be adopted first and Duck won, with Pinkster saying that he did not give up on his dreams like working as a scientist and police officer. He first appeared trying to stop criminals Stoney and Bugsy, but ended up crashing into the Loonatics. Reunited with his old friend Duck, Officer Pinkster was allowed to join them in trying to stop Stoney and Bugsy. Seemingly due to clumsiness, though, Pinkster kept letting the villains get away. It was later revealed that Pinkster was really Stoney's and Bugsy's boss, alias Pink the Pug, and was ruining the Loonatics' attempts on purpose. Pinkster also mentioned that he was destined for this life, had manipulated Duck into using a two-faced coin, and was later adopted by Stoney and Bugsy. Ace proves to have already figured Pinkster out by researching the jobs Pinkster claimed to have had. When the Curium 247 - to which Ace was exposed by Pinkster — turned out to be fake, Pinkster ended up defeated, though Duck still hoped that Pinkster could be reformed. In the tradition of his ancestor, Pinkster ended the episode in his own way by talking to the viewers saying "This ain't over, folks!"

Stoney and Bugsy
Descendants of Rocky and Mugsy, Stoney (voiced by Joe Alaskey) and Bugsy (voiced by James Arnold Taylor) are gangsters who were starting a crime wave of stealing weapons and were obtaining the mineral Curium 247 which would rob anyone with superpowers of their superpowers. Their actions were easy when Pinkster Pig assisted the Loonatics and botched up their apprehension of the two gangsters. When it came to stealing the Curium 247, Pinkster's true colors were revealed as their boss (whom they adopted from the orphanage he and Duck originally lived in) and yet they were stopped.

Original villains
The various antagonists that the Loonatics are summoned to fight. They do not seem to be based on any character(s) from Looney Tunes.

Gunnar the Conqueror
Gunnar the Conqueror (voiced by Tom Kenny) was the leader of a band of robotic Vikings whose weapons used freezing blasts. They were frozen in an iceberg in their own dimension but were released by the meteor that struck Acmetropolis and attempted to freeze the world so it is easier to take over, starting with Acmetropolis' planetary power generator. He was deactivated as well as his other minions when Ace kicked him at the planetary power core, restarting all power in the city.

Professor Zane
Professor Frederick Zane (voiced by Jeff Bennett) was a mad scientist who created the "bio-pet" "Fuz-Z" from lifeforms released by the meteor. Zane modified these lifeforms so that they grew enormous and monstrous after eating chocolate, and planned to unleash them on the world. He was originally kicked out of the science community by the Acmetropolis Science Council, believing his work to be too dangerous. The Loonatics were able to stop Zane and he was thrown in prison.

He was last seen at the end of "A Creep in the Deep" as one of the imprisoned supervillains.

Fuz-Zs
The Fuz-Zs (vocal effects provided by Steve Blum) are lifeforms that were create by Professor Zane in his plot to unleash them on Acmetropolis. They were engineered to become monstrous after eating chocolate. After Professor Zane's plot was thwarted, the Fuz-Zs were dumped into a crater.

Black Velvet
Black Velvet (voiced by Vivica A. Fox) was a woman whose eyes were damaged when the meteor hit, forcing her to live in darkness. She also has a mechanical arm and an ability to create and manipulate darkness (similar to the Darkforce). Velvet planned to use a device, called the Shroudcaster, to cover the entire planet in permanent darkness. In addition, Velvet abducted and brainwashed Tech E. Coyote to help her complete her task. She also had an army of minions (who were also brainwashed), with which she stole the necessary components. However, Danger Duck was able to break her hold over Tech using an annoying cell phone ringtone and the rest of the Loonatics reversed the polarity of the Shroudcaster. With the device's destruction came the implosion of the city blimp. She was said to have gotten away by Zadavia.

Weather Vane
Weather Vane (voiced by Kaley Cuoco) was formerly a news assistant named Paula Hayes who gained the ability to control or mentally affect the weather from the meteor. This includes the ability to generate various natural phenomena (rain, tornadoes, lightning, etc.) or control the intensity of the weather. Her main attacks are lightning and she is capable of creating cloud creatures. First, she used her powers to get in as the weather reporter. But when she is struck by the very lightning she predicted, she turned evil and her powers were vastly increased. Weather Vane has a great dislike for Acmetropolis' most famous weather girl and her boss Misty Breeze, and attempted to destroy the city unless Misty Breeze was delivered to her. She transformed into a huge Storm Dragon and when the Storm Dragon was destroyed, it was presumed that she escaped. At some point before the episode "Acmegeddon (Part One)", she appeared locked in a special holding chamber which she could not escape from. In this episode, she was freed by Optimatus along with Sypher, Mastermind and Massive. Together, the indebted villains aided Optimatus in his plan to destroy the Loonatics. However, when it was revealed that Optimatus was actually going to destroy Acmetropolis, Weather Vane and the other villains tried and failed to stop him. She and Massive together were not only able to hold their ground but even injure Optimatus, however they were eventually overpowered.

She is possibly last seen at the end of "A Creep in the Deep" as one of the imprisoned supervillains along with her old partner Massive.

Dr. Thaddeus Dare
Dr. Thaddeus Dare (voiced by Simon Templeman) was a mad scientist who devised a means of controlling Earth's geology through earthquakes and other subterranean events. He could also create rock monsters, effectively meaning his total powers combined could be considered a form of geokinesis. When the meteor hit Acmetropolis, he was horribly disfigured, by way of his arm and part of his face becoming rock, and his experiments grew more reckless, forcing the world to send him underground - literally. He performed all of these feats with a staff which could also turn his enemies into stone, which was later revealed to be powered by the Jade Serpent Stone, an ancient gemstone with a unique atomic structure, containing untold energy. His ultimate intention was world domination by taking everything that was up top to below the Earth's crust so he would live in peace on the surface. He fired a petrifying beam at the Loonatics which was deflected back at him.

His statue-form remains in Acmetropolis Park until Tech's Atomic Phase Departiculator freed him during battle with Sagittarius Stomper. He created new rock robots and stole the Shield of Perseus and altered it so that it had a gorgon's face and the ability to fire petrifying beams from the eyes on that face, a reference to what happens when you look into a gorgon's eyes. The Loonatics thwarted him again and he ended up with the same petrification fate as before when he landed on the Shield of Perseus.

The Ringmaster
The Ringmaster (voiced by Tim Curry) runs a galactic circus with mutated animals, called Galactic Oddities. The "oddities" were made from the genetic code of animals on the zoological spectrum, children and, seemingly, anyone else they could get their hands on, so to speak. The plan was to lure the Loonatics so they would be turned into monstrous hybrids with their unique genetic code. However, Tech's new Gluco-Gel 9000 destroyed the DNA Scrambler, halting the process in between. Otto transformed Ringmaster into a fearsome Balrog-faced, big-fisted, crab-clawed and tentacled monster, as a final offense in desperation. The Loonatics were able to turn Ringmaster back to normal by creating a sonic boom, then caught him and Otto and sent them to prison.

Otto the Odd
Otto the Odd (voiced by Dee Bradley Baker) served the Ringmaster's partner in crime, pretending to be a mere assistant and circus clown. He was later revealed to be the brains of the operation, at least in terms of the technology. He also claimed that the Ringmaster worked for him, though Otto did this whilst betraying his partner, so it a dubious assertion at best. When everyone was turned back to normal, Otto turned Ringmaster into a fearsome Balrog-faced, big-fisted, crab-clawed and tentacled monster, as a final offense in desperation. Alongside Ringmaster, he was sent to prison.

Otto the Odd later returned where he had a lair disguised as a space prison with a robot version of the warden. He was collecting people and items for his collection as the best anything in history. Otto hired Electro J. Fudd into hunting Ace (who Otto considered the Best Action Hero in History) and Otto lured the Loonatics out with a robot version of Massive. He changed his target to Danger Duck (who admitted to Danger Duck that he was the Best Screw-Up Action Hero in History). When Electro caught him, Otto decided to use his laser to freeze them in place. Both Electro and Duck were on the run until Ace appeared. After robot double against robot double, Otto was hit by his own laser.

Massive
Massive (voiced by Michael Clarke Duncan) is a very large criminal who can control gravity and has a very hard body structure that even lasers cannot penetrate. He committed robberies simply to make himself rich and seemingly had a compulsion for this behavior. He is also not shy about this, telling everyone his name right before he robs them. The only limit to his powers is that he can only transfer gravity from one object to another, making something heavier means making something else lighter, and vice versa. He laterworked alongside Drake Sypher, Weathervane, and Mallory Mastermind to aid Optimatus in his attempt to defeat the Loonatics in the two-part season finale "Acmegeddon." However, when it was revealed that Optimatus actually wanted to destroy Acmetropolis, Massive and the other villains tried and failed to stop him. He and Optimatus engaged in a wrestling match and were seemingly evenly matched until Weathervane aided Massive, however Optimatus was able to defeat them both with a burst of power.

He was last seen at the end of "A Creep in the Deep" as one of the imprisoned supervillains. A robot in the form of Massive was used by Otto the Odd to capture people for him to freeze for his collection.

Drake Sypher
Commonly referred to as simply "Sypher," Drake Sypher (voiced by Phil LaMarr) is a villain with the power to absorb the abilities of others into himself; not only super-powers, but also the natural abilities of living creatures. However, he cannot retain what he steals forever, despite these abilities being completely under his control. Should the original owner of said powers touch him, they can regain their powers/abilities from him. Sypher was an athlete on the Acmetropolis Rangers basherball team and stole the abilities of the head player, Trick Daley, in order to put himself into the spotlight. He absorbed all of the Loonatics' powers for personal glory, resulting in them using special exo-suits to defeat him. It was likely the Loonatics figured out that he was behind Trick Daley's sloppy performance and forced him to return the talent back to its rightful owner. He worked alongside Massive, Weathervane, and Mastermind, aiding Optimatus in his attempt to defeat the Loonatics in the two-part season finale, "Acmegeddon." Naturally the other villains did not trust him, and when Optimatus revealed that he was going to destroy Acmetropolis, Sypher and the others villains tried and failed to stop him. He started to power up using Duck's abilities but Optimatus knocked him and Mastermind out with a blast of power.

Arthur "Time Skip" Chroniker
Arthur "Time Skip" Chroniker (voiced by David Faustino) is the villainous grandson of Dr. Fidel Chroniker who can control time. After a mishap during one of his grandfather's time travel experiments, he developed a form of chronokinesis which allowed him to freeze time. Believing that the military stole his idea for a giant robot, he exacted his "revenge" by stealing the finished machine they made, the Trolbot 9000. It took the Loonatics and Dr. Chroniker to set a time trap for Time Skip. It was done when the Loonatics got to the Trolbot 9000 before he did, forcing Time Skip to take a fighter plane, but his ship was hit by Tech's new Metallic Converter and turned to dust. He was put in an energy sphere which neutralized his powers; his grandfather swore to take away his powers.

He was last seen briefly at the end of "A Creep in the Deep" in a specialized prison facility.

Mallory "Mastermind" Casey
Mallory "Mastermind" Casey (voiced by Florence Henderson) was a former college student who worked closely with Tech E. Coyote before the meteor hit. She tried to drain the brain of every professor at Acme Institute, but was busted by Tech. However, a malfunction of her brain-draining device resulted in an accident which increased the size of Mallory's brain. Sometime after this, she mastered the ability to turn any metal object into a weapon. When others learned of this, she was put into a subterranean prison. However, she still planned her escape from jail and her revenge on Tech by taking over the Loonatics HQ. When she was eventually freed by the carelessness of one of her newer guards, she went after Tech and the other Loonatics, taking control of everything electronic in their home and that Tech had made for them. Tech eventually defeated her with an EMP device. She later worked alongside Massive, Sypher, and Weathervane to aid Optimatus in his attempt to defeat the Loonatics in the two-part season finale "Acmegeddon." When it was revealed that Optimatus wanted to destroy Acmetropolis, Mastermind and the other villains tried and failed to stop him. She and Sypher were knocked out with a blast of power from Optimatus. Also in the episode, she trapped the Loonatics in her own cell in the subterranean prison. The deactivation code to it was a locker combination (1-6-3-2-0-8) which she had shared with Tech. This infers that she and Tech may have had a romantic relationship. She also often incorrectly refers to him, perhaps intentionally, as a "dog", often annoying him.

Optimatus
Optimatus (voiced by Charlie Adler) is Zadavia's evil brother. He is a mysterious character who possesses similar, if not exactly the same, powers and abilities as Zadavia. Optimatus has a cybernetic eye due to an accident on Freleng which resulted in him getting caught in the heat of the jet Zadavia tried to escape on, for which she claimed to be sorry about. At the time of the Loonatics' first season in the year of 2772, he resided on a ruined planetoid which he used as his base of operations during all of his Loonatics appearances (it is not made clear whether this is in fact the remains of his futuristic home world of Freleng or just somewhere he set up base after tracking down his sister, however Zadavia states that Freelang is located in an alternate galaxy and the planetoid was located at the edge of the Loonatics' Solar System). He appears in the final moments of "The Comet Cometh" to state that the meteor's striking Acmetropolis in 2773 was actually a deliberate attempt to destroy Acmetropolis, as was the 500-times smaller first meteor that the episode involves. With both attempts having failed, he also states that he plans to attack the planet a third time in the future. In the two-part season finale "Acmegeddon," Optimatus appears again to fulfill his promise, freeing Massive, Mastermind, Sypher, and Weathervane to aid his attempt to defeat the Loonatics. He also entices them by claiming that he will allow them to rule Acmetropolis if they succeed. After he made up his mind that the criminals he had freed "failed" him, he revealed his latest plan to destroy Acmetropolis: sucking it up into a wormhole. He then sends the criminals back to Acmetropolis, saying they can still "rule for five minutes". In the end, however, he and his Optiforce (apparent remnants of robots who served him on his homeworld) are eventually defeated, and he is sucked into one of his own wormholes. Zadavia says he will end up on a dark, cold, deserted part of space and he can then be seen huddling up to a fire, on a small piece of what was once his command center, using the remains of his Optiforce to keep the fire going. He swears he will get his revenge, but was completely disarmed upon his defeat, making a return next to impossible.

He has appeared in the second-season finale thanks to Rupes Oberon using Zadavia's stolen powers on him. Rupes Oberon later locates Optimatus and frees him.  Both of them then locate Deuce and invade Blanc in an attempt to use Blanc's wormhole technology to conquer the universe and seek out the Tweetums' scepter. He was double-crossed by General Deuce and had to fight alongside the Loonatics, Zadavia, and Sylth Vester. In the end, he renounces his evil ways and he and Zadavia return to Freleng as its rulers.

General Deuce
General Deuce (voiced by Khary Payton) is a former general of Freleng until Zadavia refused to let him put the entire planet under his command. Following Optimatus’ uprising, he and his army were nowhere to be seen. Working with Ophiuchus Sam, Deuce resurfaced to capture the train containing his robot army by duping Ace into thinking he is on the same side as him. He planned to reawaken his robot army to conquer the galaxy. After the train was disconnected by Ace, Deuce disappeared into the wormhole with the engine. Rupes Oberon and Optimatus locate Deuce and the three Frelengians invade the planet Blanc in an attempt to use Blanc's wormhole technology to conquer the universe after freeing him from the wormhole. He had General Deuce steal Rupes Oberon's Cosmic Guitar and sent him to awaken his robot army again. After this, Deuce betrays Optimatus and keeps the Tweetums' scepter (which was obtained by holding the Tweetums hostage with a blaster) along with Optimatus' sword to himself (Zadavia had retrieved the Guitar while being held prisoner), which results in Optimatus joining the Loonatics fight against Deuce. When Deuce retrieves the scepter, and an amulet which makes the scepter work (Danger Duck has this) he makes his way to the center of Blanc, with Ace hot in his trail. They both have a sword duel, which results in Ace tricking Deuce into a wormhole blast where he is sent to an unknown location.

Adolpho
Adolpho (voiced by Mark Hamill) is a mutated bottlenose dolphin who plans revenge on the world for polluting the ocean and putting dolphins in aquarium theme parks. The pollution mutated the dolphins with the abilities to change into dolphin monsters with armored backs. He and his dolphins can manipulate the wild dolphins and whales to create whirlpools to sink ships, oil rigs, oceanography stations, lighthouses, small islands and other things at sea. His henchmen captured Ace during the Loonatics' aquatic recon and trapped Ace in the tentacles of a giant jellyfish. While Lexi and Duck are rescuing Ace, Tech, Slam and Rev see a whirlpool sinking Acmetropolis. Tech and Rev figure out what needs to be done. It took Lexi and Duck to rescue Ace, break the mind control on the whales and dolphins, and defeat Adolpho, putting him in an aquarium in Acmetropolis Prison, along with the other villains.

Bio-Tech Parasite
The Bio-Tech Parasite is a living symbiotic machine that latches onto an unsuspecting victim, then forces them to act only on their most evil desires, somewhat like the alien symbiote that bonded with Spider-Man and the magic mask that turned Stanley Ipkiss into The Mask. The parasite also gives the wearer artificial telekinesis so long as it is bonded to them.

It first latched onto a pizza delivery boy named Toby who had just been threatened to be fired for his constant tardiness to those that order from the pizza parlor he worked at. The Bio-Tech Parasite forced him to seek revenge on his boss by causing him to manipulate anything in the pizza parlor. Ace Bunny was able to detach it with a shot from his laser eyes, and the pizza boy was freed. Afterward, the Loonatics captured and contained it for a time. However, when Rip Runner stole his older brother Rev Runner's access card and found the parasite, he became its next victim and it caused him to manipulate the Robo-Amigos that Rev created and try to destroy Acmetropolis. After the parasite had been on too long to be removed by the Loonatics, Rev managed to scare the parasite into coming off. Finally, the parasite's owner, a young extraterrestrial female, reclaimed it and took it home, calling the creature "Spikey".

Queen Athena
Queen Athena (voiced by Serena Williams) is the queen of the Apocazons who live on the island of Apocalypso. She and the Apocazons drink nectar that enables them to control plant life. They captured the construction workers for Utopia Acres. They wanted Lexi to join them in the Zero Hour where they will use their plant-like weapons to rid Acmetropolis of its annoying men when they take over. Queen Athena saw through Ace and Danger Duck's disguises when they were looking for Lexi. Since Lexi drank the nectar, she took on Queen Athena and they were evenly matched. Lexi learned that they just wanted to go to another non-hostile planet after what happened to their planet. With the Loonatics' help, they got the Apocazons off Acmetropolis before the missiles sent by Tech impacted Apocalypso Island.

Rupes Oberon
Also known as the "Keyboard Man", Rupes Oberon (voiced by Jason Marsden) is a villain from Freleng who wanted to be a member of Zadavia's Royal Court. He even presented Zadavia with a national anthem, but was rejected as Freleng already had an anthem that had words. Rupes used Boötes and his band to make Tech build the Cosmic Guitar to drain Zadavia's powers in order to manipulate the fabric of the universe. They confronted him and his mannequin band at Galaxyfest. He successfully kidnapped Zadavia and got away to use some of her powers to free Optimatus who was trapped in a black hole. He even made the same request about the anthem to him. Both of them locate General Deuce and they invade the planet Blanc in an attempt to use Blanc's wormhole technology to take over the universe. Rupes was double-crossed by Optimatus who had General Deuce steal the Cosmic Guitar from him and was imprisoned after the Loonatics questioned him about Optimatus' plot.

Boötes Belinda
Boötes Belinda (voiced by Bootsy Collins) is a rock star who, with his band, comes to Acmetropolis to wreak havoc. He trapped Zadavia in an energy-draining dome and made off with her. In exchange for her freedom, Boötes wanted Tech to build a 64-stringed Cosmic Guitar for him. He was nothing more than a mannequin controlled by Rupes Oberon.

References

Lists of characters in American television animation
Television characters introduced in 2005